Yuvaraja, also rendered Yuvraj, is an Indian title for the crown prince, and the heir apparent to the throne of an Indian (notably Hindu) kingdom or (notably in the Mughal Empire or British Raj) princely state. It is usually applied to the eldest son of a Raja (King) or Maharaja (Great King), a kshatriya chief ruling one of the former kingdoms or vassal-rank princely states.

References

Heirs apparent

Sanskrit words and phrases